Gazeta de Alagoas is a Brazilian newspaper, published in Alagoas. It belongs to the family of Fernando Collor. This Brazilian newspaper is the leader, in sales, in the Brazilian state of Alagoas.

External links 
 Gazeta de Alagoas  > Official site, in Portuguese.

1934 establishments in Brazil
Alagoas
Newspapers published in Brazil
Portuguese-language newspapers
Publications established in 1934